Frank Morton may refer to:

 Frank Morton (cricketer) (1901–1971), Australian cricketer
 Frank Morton (chemical engineer) (1906–1999), professor of chemical engineering
 Frank Morton (journalist) (1869–1923), journalist and poet in Australia
 Frank Morton (plant breeder) (born 1955), founding member of the Open Source Seed Initiative